Andrew Saxton (born 4 May 1967), is a male former weightlifter who competed for Great Britain and England and Australia.

Weightlifting career
Saxton represented Great Britain in the 1988 Summer Olympics.

He represented England and won a bronze medal in the 100 kg sub-heavyweight division, at the 1986 Commonwealth Games in Edinburgh, Scotland. Four years later he represented England and won three gold medals in the 100 kg sub-heavyweight division, at the 1990 Commonwealth Games in Auckland, New Zealand. The three medals were won during an unusual period when three medals were awarded in one category (clean and jerk, snatch and combined) which invariably led to the same athlete winning all three of the same colour medal.

References

1967 births
English male weightlifters
Commonwealth Games medallists in weightlifting
Commonwealth Games gold medallists for England
Commonwealth Games bronze medallists for England
Weightlifters at the 1986 Commonwealth Games
Weightlifters at the 1990 Commonwealth Games
Weightlifters at the 1988 Summer Olympics
Olympic weightlifters of Great Britain
Sportspeople from Wagga Wagga
Living people
Medallists at the 1986 Commonwealth Games
Medallists at the 1990 Commonwealth Games